A Wolstenholme number is a number that is the numerator of the generalized harmonic number Hn,2.

The first such numbers are 1, 5, 49, 205, 5269, 5369, 266681, 1077749, ... .

These numbers are named after Joseph Wolstenholme, who proved Wolstenholme's theorem on modular relations of the generalized harmonic numbers.

References
 

Integer sequences